The traditional culture of Korea  is the shared cultural and historical heritage of Korea and southern Manchuria before the division of Korea in 1945. Manchuria refers to the ancient geographical and historical region in Northeast Asia, including countries like China and Russia. 

Since the mid-20th century, Korea has been split between the North Korean and South Korean states, resulting in a number of cultural differences that can be observed even today. Before the Joseon dynasty, the practice of Korean shamanism was deeply rooted in Korean culture.

Clothing

The traditional dress known as hanbok  (한복, 韓服) (known as joseonot [조선옷] in the DPRK) has been worn since ancient times. The hanbok consists of a shirt (jeogori) and a skirt (chima).

According to social status, Koreans used to dress differently, making clothing an important mark of social rank. Costumes were worn by the ruling class and the royal family. These upper classes also used jewelry to distance themselves from the ordinary people. A traditional item of jewellery for women was a pendant in the shape of certain elements of nature which was made of gemstones, to which a tassel of silk was connected.

Common people were often restricted to undyed plain clothes. This everyday dress underwent relatively few changes during the Joseon period. The basic everyday dress was shared by everyone, but distinctions were drawn in official and ceremonial clothes.

During the winter people wore cotton-wadded dresses. Fur was also common. Because ordinary people normally wore pure white undyed materials, the people were sometimes referred to as the white-clad people.

Hanbok are classified according to their purposes: everyday dress, ceremonial dress and special dress. Ceremonial dresses are worn on formal occasions, including a child's first birthday (doljanchi), a wedding or a funeral. Special dresses are made for purposes such as shamans, officials.

Today the hanbok is still worn during formal occasions. The everyday use of the dress, however, has been lost. However, elderly still dress in hanbok as well as active estates of the remnant of aristocratic families from the Joseon Dynasty. Though this may be changing with something of a modern interest in the traditional dress among some of the young.

Traditionally, the hanbok was a wedding dress that dates back to the 14th century. It was a floor-length gown with an empire waist, fitted jacket, and sewn with vibrant or pastel colors. The use of the Hanbok in daily wear has dropped significantly over the last handful of decades. Park Hyung Sook has challenged the traditional hanbok that Korea is used to. Park Hyung Sook has been designing for decades before she ventured out on her own. She is known to wear her own designs paired with jeans or shorts for a more casual look. Her clothes are meant to be worn either casually or formally, it is not fast fashion but easy. 

For one of her collections, she focused on black and white pieces that can be worn to brunch, the office, or even formal events. It is a drastic difference from the rainbow colors that used to be worn by Korea's royalty and upper-class citizens of the Joseon Dynasty, where the colors of your hanbok spoke of your status. Some of Park's designs consisted of mini skirts with ruffles, spaghetti straps, polka dots, and other vivid designs. Park Hyung Sook and her sister Geum Sook, launched their first collection titled GrangHanA in 2014.

Just like most things, when it comes to changing something that has not changed in many decades, there is always pushback. When Park was asked about opening a shop outside of Korea, she was touched. Although many critics of the hanbok told her that the design should be left alone, she countered them. Hanbok is a garment that is beautiful in its own way, and many have tried to keep it from changing. Many have questioned the logic behind keeping hanbok where it is, within Korea, and not letting it venture out. Many designers have tried to take Hanbok overseas.

The Korean In Me, a designer brand, also released a collection of modern hanbok that has been embraced by people all over the world. Their designs feature embroidered dragons and phoenix patterns originally reserved for royalty, and peonies embroidered on wedding dresses representing honor and wealth. Giving the hanbok a meaningful design that links them to the culture and heritage of Korea.

In recent years, with the rise of attention to K-Pop, (Korean Pop Music), interest in Korean culture has spiked to an all-time high. Many groups, such as BTS, BlackPink, KARD, and many more, have been praised for showing their culture and heritage by wearing Hanbok in music videos, award shows, and other public appearances.

Cuisine

Rice is the staple food of Korea. Having been an almost exclusively agricultural country until recently, the essential recipes in Korea are shaped by this experience. The main crops in Korea are rice, barley, and beans, but many supplementary crops are used. Fish and other seafood are also important because Korea is a peninsula.

Fermented recipes were also developed in early times and often characterize traditional Korean food. These include pickled fish and pickled vegetables. This kind of food provides essential proteins and vitamins during the winter.

Kimchi is one of the famous foods of Korea. Kimchi is pickled vegetables which contain vitamins A and C, thiamine, riboflavin, iron, calcium, carotene, etc. There are many types of kimchi including cabbage kimchi, spring onion kimchi, cucumber kimchi, radish kimchi, and sesame kimchi.

Side Dishes or (Banchan) are commonly eaten with meals in Korea. The main dish is almost always served with side dishes. Some commonly eaten side dishes are: Kimchi, Pickled Radish, Soybean Sprouts, Glass Noodles (Japchae), Cucumber Salad, and Seasoned Spinach.

Ceremonial, ritual and temple foods 
A number of dishes have been developed. These can be divided into ceremonial foods and ritual foods. Ceremonial foods are used when a child reaches 100 days, at the first birthday, at a wedding ceremony, and the sixtieth birthday. Ritual foods are used at funerals, at ancestral rites, shaman's offerings and as temple food.

A distinguishing characteristic of Temple Food is that it does not use the common five strong-flavoured ingredients of Korean cuisine--(garlic, spring onion, wild rocambole, leek, and ginger), and meat.

For ceremonies and rituals, rice cakes are vital. The colouring of the food and the ingredients of the recipes are matched with a balance of yin and yang.

Royal court cuisine (surasang)
Today, surasang (traditional court cuisine) is available to the whole population. In the past, vegetable dishes were essential. However, meat consumption has increased. Traditional dishes include ssambap, bulgogi, sinseollo, kimchi, bibimbap, and gujeolpan.

Tea

Originally tea was used for ceremonial purposes or as part of traditional herbal medicine. Some of teas made of fruits, leaves, seeds or roots are enjoyed. Five tastes of tea are distinguished in Korea: sweet, sour, salty, bitter, and pungent.

Festivals

The traditional Korean calendar was based on the lunisolar calendar. Dates are calculated from Korea's meridian. Observances and festivals are rooted in Korean culture. The Korean lunar calendar is divided into 24 turning points (절기), each lasting about 15 days. The lunar calendar was the timetable for the agrarian society in the past, but is vanishing in the modern Korean lifestyle.

The Gregorian calendar was officially adopted in 1895, but traditional holidays and age reckoning are still based on the old calendar.  Older generations still celebrate their birthdays according to the lunar calendar.

The biggest festival in Korea today is Seollal (the traditional Korean New Year). Other important festivals include Daeboreum (the first full moon), Dano (spring festival), and Chuseok (harvest festival).

There are also a number of regional festivals, celebrated according to the lunar calendar.

Fine arts

Ceramics

In the Goryeo period, jade green celadon ware became more popular. In the 12th century, sophisticated methods of inlaying were invented, allowing more elaborate decorations in different colors. In Arts of Korea, Evelyn McCune states, "During the twelfth century, the production of ceramic ware reached its highest refinement. Several new varieties appeared simultaneously in the quarter of a century, one of which, the inlaid ware must be considered a Korean invention." William Bowyer Honey of the Victoria and Albert Museum of England after World War II wrote, "The best Corean (Korean) wares were not only original, they are the most gracious and unaffected pottery ever made. They have every virtue that pottery can have. This Korean pottery, in fact, reached heights hardly attained even by the Chinese."

White porcelain became popular in the 15th century and soon overtook celadon ware. White porcelain was commonly painted or decorated with copper.

During the Imjin wars in the 16th century, Korean potters were brought back to Japan where they heavily influenced Japanese ceramics.
Many Japanese pottery families today can trace their art and ancestry to these Korean potters whom the Japanese captured during its attempted conquests of the Korean peninsula.

In the late Joseon period (late 17th century) blue-and-white porcelain became popular. Designs were painted in cobalt blue on white porcelain.

Crafts
There is a unique set of handicrafts produced in Korea. Most of the handicrafts are created for particular everyday use, often giving priority to practical use rather than aesthetics. Traditionally, metal, wood, fabric, lacquerware, and earthenware were the main materials used, but later glass, leather or paper have sporadically been used.

Many sophisticated and elaborate handicrafts have been excavated, including gilt crowns, patterned pottery, pots or ornaments. During the Goryeo period the use of bronze was advanced. Brass, that is copper with one third zinc, has been a particularly popular material. The dynasty, however, is most prominently renowned for its use of celadon ware.

During the Joseon period, popular handicrafts were made of porcelain and decorated with blue painting. Woodcraft was also advanced during that period. This led to more sophisticated pieces of furniture, including wardrobes, chests, tables or drawers. It is part of a craft that goes back well over a millennium, keeping alive a tradition that remains unchanged from at least the seventeenth century. It is this tradition that has made Korean furniture one of the most sought-after styles of exotic furniture by antique dealers and collectors worldwide. Immediately recognizable as Korean, this unique art was only "discovered" by the West in the late 1940s and 1950s.

Dance and martial arts

In Korea, there is a distinction between court dance and folk dance. Common court dances are jeongjaemu (정재무) performed at banquets, and ilmu (일무), performed at Korean Confucian rituals.Jeongjaemu is divided into native dances (향악정재, hyangak jeongjae) and forms imported from Central Asia and China (당악정재, dangak jeongjae). Ilmu are divided into civil dance (문무, munmu) and military dance (무무, mumu). Many mask dramas and mask dances are performed in many regional areas of Korea. It is pink with multiple symbols around the neck area.

Traditional choreography of court dances is reflected in many contemporary productions, and the strong dance tradition in the country carries on to this day, with many dance groups forming over the last few decades.

Taekkyon, a traditional Korean martial art, is central to the classic Korean dance. Taekkyon, being a complete system of integrated movement, found its core techniques adaptable to mask, dance and other traditional artforms of Korea. Taekwondo, a Korean martial art, began in the 1940s in Korea.

Painting

The earliest paintings found on the Korean peninsula are petroglyphs of prehistoric times. With the arrival of Buddhism from India via China, different techniques were introduced. These techniques quickly established themselves as the mainstream techniques, but indigenous techniques still survived. Among them were the Goguryeo tomb murals. These murals inside many of the tombs are an invaluable insight into the ceremonies, warfare, architecture, and daily life of ancient Goguryeo people. Balhae kingdom, a successor state of Goguryeo, absorbed much of traditional Goguryeo elements.

There is a tendency towards naturalism with subjects such as realistic landscapes, flowers and birds being particularly popular. Ink is the most common material used, and it is painted on mulberry paper or silk. Humorous details are sometimes present.

In the 18th century, indigenous techniques were advanced, particularly in calligraphy and seal engraving.

During the Joseon period, new genres of Korean painting flourished, such as chaekgeori (paintings of books) and munjado (paintings of letters), revealing the infatuation with books and learning in Korean culture.

Arts are both influenced by tradition and realism. For example, Han's near-photographic "Break Time at the Ironworks" shows muscular men dripping with sweat and drinking water from tin cups at a sweltering foundry. Jeong Son’s "Peak Chonnyo of Mount Kumgang" is a classical Korean landscape of towering cliffs shrouded by mists.

Music

There is a genre distinction between folk music and court music. Korean folk music is varied and complex in different ways, but all forms of folk music maintain a set of rhythms (called 장단; Jangdan) and a loosely defined set of melodic modes. Korean folk music is Pansori (판소리) performed by one singer and one drummer. Occasionally, there might be dancers and narrators. They have been designated an intangible cultural property in UNESCO's Memory of the world, and Pungmul (풍물) performed by drumming, dancing and singing. Samul Nori is a type of Korean traditional music based on Pungmul, and Sanjo (산조) that is played without a pause in faster tempos. Nongak (농악) means "farmers' music".

Korean court music can be traced to the beginning of the Joseon Dynasty in 1392. Korean court musics include A-ak, Dang-ak and Hyang-ak. The traditional Korean music is still played and sung a lot.

Gardens

The principles of temple gardens and private gardens are the same. Korean gardening in East Asia is influenced by primarily Korean Shamanism and Korean folk religion. Shamanism emphasizes nature and mystery, paying great attention to the details of the layout. In contrast to Japanese and Chinese gardens, which fill a garden with man-made elements, traditional Korean gardens avoid artificialities, trying to make a garden "more natural than nature".

The lotus pond is an important feature in the Korean garden. If there is a natural stream, often a pavilion is built next to it, allowing the pleasure of watching the water. Terraced flower beds are a common feature in traditional Korean gardens.

The Poseokjeong site near Gyeongju was built in the Silla period. It highlights the importance of water in traditional Korean gardens. The garden of Poseokjeong features an abalone-shaped watercourse. During the last days of the Silla kingdom, the king's guests would sit along the watercourse and chat while wine cups were floated during banquets.

Houses

Korean traditional houses are called Hanok (Hangul:한옥).Sites of residence are traditionally selected using traditional geomancy. While the geomancy had been a vital part of Korean culture and Korean Shamanism since prehistoric times, geomancy was later re-introduced by China during the Three Kingdoms period of Korea's history.

A house is built against a hill and face south to receive as much sunlight as possible. This orientation is still preferred in modern Korea. Geomancy also influences the shape of the building, the direction it faces, and the material the house is constructed with.

Traditional Korean houses can be structured into an inner wing (안채, anchae) and an outer wing (사랑채, sarangchae). The individual layout largely depends on the region and the wealth of the family. Whereas aristocrats used the outer wing for receptions, poorer people kept cattle in the sarangchae. The wealthier a family, the larger the house. However, it was forbidden to any family except for the king to have a residence of more than 99 kan. A kan is the distance between two pillars used in traditional houses.

The inner wing normally consisted of a living room, a kitchen, and a wooden-floored central hall. More rooms may be attached to this. Poorer farmers would not have any outer wings. Floor heating (온돌, ondol) has been used in Korea since prehistoric times. The main building materials are wood, clay, tile, stone, and thatch. Because wood and clay were the most common materials used in the past not many old buildings have survived into present times.

Religious beliefs

The original religion of the Korean people was Shamanism, which though not as widespread as in ancient times, still survives to this day. Female shamans or mudang are often called upon to enlist the help of various spirits to achieve various means.

Buddhism and Confucianism were later introduced to Korea through cultural exchanges with Chinese dynasties. Buddhism was the official religion of the Goryeo dynasty, and many privileges were given to Buddhist monks during this period. However, the Joseon period saw the suppression of Buddhism, where Buddhist monks and temples were banned from the cities and confined to the countryside. In its place a strict form of Confucianism, which some see as even more strict than what had ever been adopted by the Chinese, became the official philosophy. Korean Confucianism was epitomized by the seonbi class, scholars who passed up positions of wealth and power to lead lives of study and integrity.

Throughout Korean history and culture, regardless of separation, the traditional beliefs of Korean Shamanism, Mahayana Buddhism and Confucianism have remained an underlying influence of the religion of the Korean people as well as a vital aspect of their culture. In fact, all these traditions coexisted peacefully for hundreds of years. They still exist in the more Christian South and in the North, despite pressure from its government.

Influence of Buddhism on culture and traditions

Korean culture is deeply influenced by the Buddhism as Buddhism has become inherent aspect of the Korea culture, including the secular Korean traditions followed by the non-Buddhist Koreans. A 2005 government survey indicated that about a quarter of South Koreans identified as Buddhist. However, the actual number of Buddhists in South Korea is ambiguous as there is no exact or exclusive criterion by which Buddhists can be identified, unlike the Christian population. With Buddhism's incorporation into traditional Korean culture, it is now considered a philosophy and cultural background rather than a formal religion. As a result, many people outside of the practicing population are deeply influenced by these traditions. Thus, when counting secular believers or those influenced by the faith while not following other religions, the number of Buddhists in South Korea is considered to be much larger. Similarly, in officially atheist North Korea, while Buddhists officially account for 4.5% of the population, a much larger number (over 70%) of the population are influenced by Buddhist philosophies and customs.

When Buddhism was originally introduced to Korea from Former Qin[the 4th century state in Northern China] in 372, about 800 years after the death of the historical Gautama Buddha[founder of Buddhism], shamanism[a religious practice] was the indigenous religion. The Samguk yusa and Samguk sagi record the following 3 monks who were among the first to bring Buddhist teaching, or Dharma, to Korea in the 4th century during the Three Kingdoms period: Malananta – an Indian Buddhist monk who came from Serindian area of southern China's Eastern Jin Dynasty and brought Buddhism to the King Baekje of Baekje in the southern Korean peninsula in 384 CE, Sundo – a monk from northern Chinese state Former Qin brought Buddhism to Goguryeo in northern Korea in 372 CE, and Ado – a monk who brought Buddhism to Silla in central Korea. As Buddhism was not seen to conflict with the rites of nature worship, it was allowed by adherents of Shamanism to be blended into their religion. Thus, the mountains that were believed by shamanists to be the residence of spirits in pre-Buddhist times later became the sites of Buddhist temples.

Though it initially enjoyed wide acceptance, even being supported as the state ideology during the Goryeo (918–1392 CE) period, Buddhism in Korea suffered extreme repression during the Joseon (1392–1897 CE) era, which lasted over five hundred years. During this period, Neo-Confucianism overcame the prior dominance of Buddhism. Only after Buddhist monks helped repel the Japanese invasions of Korea (1592–98) did the persecution of Buddhists stop. Buddhism in Korea remained subdued until the end of the Joseon period when its position was strengthened somewhat by the colonial period, which lasted from 1910 to 1945. However, these Buddhist monks did not only put an end to Japanese rule in 1945, but they also asserted their specific and separate religious identity by reforming their traditions and practices. They laid the foundation for many Buddhist societies, and the younger generation of monks came up with the ideology of Mingung Pulgyo, or "Buddhism for the people." The importance of this ideology is that it was coined by the monks who focused on common men's daily issues.

Modern cultures

Culture of South Korea

The contemporary culture of South Korea developed from the traditional culture of Korea which was prevalent in the early Korean nomadic tribes. By maintaining thousands of years of ancient Korean culture, South Korea has split on its own path of cultural development away from North Korean culture since the division of Korea in 1945. The industrialization [the development of industries in a country or region on a wide scale], urbanization [process of population movement to cities] and westernization [the adoption of or assimilation by the Western culture] of South Korea, especially Seoul [the capital of South Korea], have brought many changes to the way Korean people live. Changing economics and lifestyles have led to a concentration of population in major cities and depopulation of the rural countryside, with multi-generational [root word: generation] households separating into nuclear family [a group of two parents and their children] living arrangements. Today, many Korean cultural elements, especially popular culture, have spread across the globe and have become some of the most prominent cultural forces in the world.

Culture of North Korea

In North Korea, a central theme of cultural expression is to take the best from the past and discard capitalist elements. Popular, vernacular styles and themes in the arts such as literature, art, music and dance are esteemed as expressing the truly unique spirit of the Korean nation.

Ethnographers, [i.e. people who do qualitative research that involves immersing yourself in a particular community or organisation to observe their behavior and interactions up close], devote much energy to restoring and reintroducing cultural forms that have the proper proletarian, or folk, spirit and that encourage the development of collective consciousness.

Proletarian refers to the Marxism study of the classes in terms of Capitalism [not to be confused with the caste system, developed by the Aryans], including the Proletarians and Bourgeoisie. Other classes including landlords, petty bourgeoisie, peasants, and lumpenproletariat also exist but are not primary in terms of the dynamics of capitalism.

Last but not least, lively, optimistic musical and choreographic expressions are stressed when it comes to dance. Group folk dances and choral singing are traditionally practiced in some but not all parts of Korea. They were being promoted throughout North Korea in the early 1990s among schools and university students. Farmers' music bands have also been revived.

Culture of Yanbian Korean Autonomous Prefecture
Both Mandarin Chinese and Korean are used as official languages in Yanbian. Vice News described the prefecture as both "West Korea" and "The Third Korea" due to the prominence of both North and South Korean culture.

The Museum of Yanbian Korean Autonomous Prefecture was planned in 1960, and constructed in 1982. It contains over 10,000 exhibits, including 11 first-level artifacts. The exhibits' labels and explanations are in 2 languages, which is in Korean and Chinese. Guided tours are also available in both of these languages.

World Heritage Sites
There are a number of designated UNESCO World Heritage Sites in Korea.

Jongmyo Shrine

The Jongmyo Shrine was added to the UNESCO World Heritage Site list in 1995 and is located in Seoul. The shrine is dedicated to the spirits of the ancestors of the royal family of the Joseon Dynasty. It is heavily influenced by Korean Confucian tradition. An elaborate performance of ancient court music (with accompanying dance) known as Jongmyo jeryeak is performed there each year.

When it was built in 1394 it was to be one of the longest buildings in Asia. There are 19 memorial tablets of kings and 30 of their queens, placed in 19 chambers. The shrine was burnt to the ground during the Imjin wars, but rebuilt in 1608.

Changdeokgung

Changdeokgung is also known as the "palace of illustrious virtue". It was built in 1405, burnt to the ground during the Imjin wars in 1592 and reconstructed in 1609. For more than 300 years Changdeokgung was the site of the royal seat. It is located in Seoul.

The surroundings and the palace itself are well matched. Some of the trees behind the palace are now over 300 years old, besides a preserved tree which is over 1000 years old. Changdeokgung was added to the UNESCO World Heritage list in 1997.

Bulguksa

Bulguksa is also known as the temple of the Buddha Land and home of the Seokguram Grotto. The temple was constructed in 751 and consists of a great number of halls. There are two pagodas placed in the temple.

The Seokguram grotto is a hermitage of the Bulguksa temple. It is a granite sanctuary. In the main chamber a Buddha statue is seated. The temple and the grotto were added to the UNESCO World Heritage list in 1995.

Tripitaka Koreana and Haeinsa

Haeinsa is a large temple in the South Gyeongsang province. It was originally built in 802 and home to the Tripitaka Koreana wood blocks, the oldest Buddhist wooden manuscripts in the world. The carving of these wood blocks was initiated in 1236 and completed in 1251. The wood blocks are testimony to the pious devotion of king and his people.

The word Tripitaka is Sanskrit and stands for three baskets, referring to the Buddhist laws of aesthetics. The Tripitaka Koreana consists of 81'258 wood blocks and is the largest, oldest, and most complete collection of Buddhist scripts. Amazingly there is no trace of errata or omission on any of the wood blocks. The Tripitaka Koreana is widely considered as the most beautiful and accurate Buddhist canon carved in Hanja.

The site was added to the UNESCO World Heritage list in 1995.

Hwaseong

Hwaseong is the fortification of the city Suwon south of Seoul in South Korea. Its construction was completed in 1796 and it features all the latest features of Korean fortification known at the time. The fortress also contains a magnificent palace used for the King's visit to his father's tomb near the city.

The fortress covers both flat land and hilly terrain, something rarely seen in East Asia. The walls are 5.52 kilometres long and there are 41 extant facilities along the perimeter. These include four cardinal gates, a floodgate, four secret gates and a beacon tower.

Hwaseong was added to the UNESCO World Heritage list in 1997.

Namhansanseong

Namhansanseong became a UNESCO World Heritage Site in 2014.

Sansa, Buddhist Mountain Monasteries 
The Sansa are Buddhist mountain monasteries located throughout the southern provinces of the Korean Peninsula. The spatial arrangement of the seven temples that comprise the property, established from the 7th to 9th centuries, present common characteristics that are specific to Korea – the ‘madang’ (open courtyard) flanked by four buildings (Buddha Hall, pavilion, lecture hall and dormitory). They contain a large number of individually remarkable structures, objects, documents and shrines. These mountain monasteries are sacred places, which have survived as living centres of faith and daily religious practice to the present.

Historic Monuments and Sites in Kaesong

The Historic Monuments and Sites in Kaesong became a UNESCO World Heritage Site in 2013.

Gochang, Hwasun and Ganghwa sites

The sites of Gochang, Hwasun and Ganghwa were added to the UNESCO list of World Heritage in 2000. These sites are home to prehistoric graveyards which contain hundreds of different megaliths. These megaliths are gravestones which were created in the 1st century B.C. out of large blocks of rock. Megaliths can be found around the globe, but nowhere in such a concentration as in the sites of Gochang, Hwasun and Ganghwa.

Gyeongju Area

The historic area around Gyeongju was added to the UNESCO list of World Heritage in 2000. Gyeongju was the capital of the Silla kingdom. The tombs of the Silla rulers can still be found in the centre of the city. These tombs took the shape of rock chambers buried in an earthen hill, sometimes likened with the pyramids. The area around Gyeongju, in particular on the Namsan mountain, is scattered with hundreds of remains from the Silla period. Poseokjeong is one of the most famous of these sites, but there is a great number of Korean Buddhist art, sculptures, reliefs, pagodas and remains of temples and palaces mostly built in the 7th and 10th century.

Complex of Koguryo Tombs

The Complex of Koguryo Tombs lies in Pyongyang, Pyong'an South Province, and Nampo City, South Hwanghae Province, North Korea. In July 2004 it became the first UNESCO World Heritage site north of the 38th parallel.

The site consists of 63 individual tombs from the later Goguryeo, one of the Three Kingdoms of Korea. It was founded around northern Korea and Manchuria around 32 BC, and the capital was moved to Pyongyang in 427. This kingdom dominated the region between the 5th and 7th century AD.

Royal Tombs of the Joseon Dynasty

Historic Villages of Korea: Hahoe and Yangdong

See also 

K-pop
Korean Wave
Korean birthday celebrations
 Science and technology in Korea
 List of Korean inventions
 National Treasures of South Korea
 UNESCO World Heritage sites
 Traditional Korean thought
 East Asian age reckoning
 Marriage in South Korea
 Korean Buddhist sculpture
 Korean influence on Japanese culture
 Chinese influence on Korean culture
 Japanese influence on Korean culture

References

External links

Korea Society Podcast: The Origins of Koreans and Their Culture – Part I
Korea Society Podcast: The Origins of Koreans and Their Culture – Part II
Online gallery specialized on introducing North Korean artists
Early photographs project showing public scenes, behavior, buildings 1895–1930
Brief Explanation of Korean Customs (general customs, respect, marriage, dining)
http://blog.daum.net/ulsanlike/11788545 ulsan Korea
Korean Style And Fashion